The 2019 Tour de Luxembourg was the 79th edition of the Tour de Luxembourg road cycling stage race. It was held between 5 and 9 June, as a 2.HC event as part of the 2019 UCI Europe Tour.

Schedule

Teams
Thirteen UCI Professional Continental teams, three UCI Continental teams, and the Luxembourg national team made up the seventeen teams that participated the race. Of these riders, only 90 finished the race.

UCI Professional Continental Teams

 
 
 
 
 
 
 
 
 
 
 
 
 

UCI Continental Teams

 
 
 

National Teams

 Luxembourg

Stages

Prologue
5 June 2019 — Luxembourg City to Luxembourg City,  (ITT)

Stage 1
6 June 2019 — Luxembourg City to Bascharage,

Stage 2
7 June 2019 — Steinfort to Rosport,

Stage 3
8 June 2019 — Mondorf to Diekirch,

Stage 4
9 June 2019 — Mersch to Luxembourg City,

Classification leadership table

Final classification standings

General classification

Points classification

Mountains classification

Young rider classification

Teams classification

Notes

References

External links

Tour de Luxembourg
Tour de Luxembourg
Tour de Luxembourg
Tour de Luxembourg